Hajj Bolagh (also Romanized as Ḩājj Bolāgh and Haj Bolagh; also known as Ḩājī Bolāgh, Hājībulāgh, and Ḩājjī Bolāgh) is a village in Kuhsar Rural District, in the Central District of Khansar County, Isfahan Province, Iran. At the 2006 census, its population was 49, in 20 families.

References 

Populated places in Khansar County